Yelena Burukhina (born March 9, 1977) is a former Russian cross-country skier who has competed since 1996. She won two medals at the 2003 FIS Nordic World Ski Championships with a silver (30 km) and a bronze (4 × 5 km relay).

Burukina's best individual finish at the Winter Olympics was 13th in the 15 km at Salt Lake City in 2002. She has two individual career victories at 5 km (2002) and at 10 km (2005).

Cross-country skiing results
All results are sourced from the International Ski Federation (FIS).

Olympic Games

World Championships
 2 medals – (1 silver, 1 bronze)

a.  Cancelled due to extremely cold weather.

World Cup

Season standings

Individual podiums

2 podiums

Team podiums

 2 podiums

References

External links

1977 births
Living people
Russian female cross-country skiers
Cross-country skiers at the 2002 Winter Olympics
Cross-country skiers at the 2006 Winter Olympics
Olympic cross-country skiers of Russia
FIS Nordic World Ski Championships medalists in cross-country skiing
People from Dolgoprudny
Sportspeople from Moscow Oblast
21st-century Russian women